Triphora trianthophoros, the threebirds or three birds orchid, or nodding pogonia, is a species of  terrestrial orchid native to eastern North America.

Description 
Triphora trianthophoros is a small, terrestrial,  semi-saprophytic orchid.   The showiest member of its genus, T. trianthophoros has 1-8 (often 3, thus the name) nodding flowers that are roughly 2 cm in size and sit atop stems 8–25 cm tall.  Leaves are small (~1 cm X 1.5 cm) and typically dark green to purple.  The orchid blooms from July through September, but is infamous for its elusive nature, with ephemeral flowers lasting for only several hours on a few days of the year. It has further been reported that populations across a region synchronize blooming on specific days, making observation of flowering specimens even more difficult.  Several forms of T. trianthophoros exist, including forma albidoflava (Keenan) with white flowers, forma caerulea (P.M. Brown) with blue flowers, and forma rossii (P.M. Brown) with multi-colored flowers.

Habitat and range 
Triphora trianthophoros is native to the eastern North America, ranging from as far south as Panama and north through Central America and the central and eastern United States into Ontario. Despite its wide distribution, the species is rare throughout much of its range and has been given  G3G4 (secured, but with cause for concern) conservation status by NatureServe.

Triphora trianthophoros is usually found in mixed deciduous forests.  Co-located species often include  partridgeberry and beech trees.

References 

Triphorinae